Night Lady is an album by saxophonist Johnny Griffin recorded in West Germany in 1963. Originally released on the Philips label, Night Lady was later released on EmArcy Records.

Reception
Allmusic awarded the album three stars.

Track listing 
All compositions by Francy Boland except as indicated
 "Scrabble" (Johnny Griffin) - 7:18   
 "Summertime" (George Gershwin, Ira Gershwin, DuBose Heyward) - 5:53   
 "Old Stuff" - 8:05   
 "Night Lady" - 9:23   
 "Little Man You've Had A Busy Day" (Al Hoffman, Maurice Sigler, Mabel Wayne) - 5:20   
 "All the Things You Are" (Oscar Hammerstein II, Jerome Kern) - 6:11

Personnel 
 Johnny Griffin - tenor saxophone
 Francy Boland - piano
 Jimmy Woode - bass
 Kenny Clarke - drums

References 

Johnny Griffin albums
1964 albums
Philips Records albums